Stockar McDougle (born January 11, 1977) is a former American football offensive lineman. He was originally drafted by the Detroit Lions 20th overall in the 2000 NFL Draft. He played college football at Oklahoma.

Early life and college
McDougle was born in Pompano Beach, Florida. He was in the top prep offensive linemen in the nation when graduated from Deerfield Beach High School in 1996.  He was named a JUCO All-American in 1996 and 1997 at Navarro Junior College  before transferring to the University of Oklahoma in 1998.

Professional career
The Detroit Lions selected McDougle 20th in the first round of the 2000 NFL Draft. Debuting in Week 10 (November 5, 2000) against the Atlanta Falcons, McDougle started all eight games he played as a rookie. McDougle started 3 of 9 games in 2001 and 11 of 12 games in 2002.  In 2003 and 2004, McDougle played full 16-game seasons as a right tackle and started every game. The Lions allowed a franchise-record low 11 sacks in 2003 followed by 37 in 2004. Also in 2004, McDougle helped rookie running back Kevin Jones rush for 1,133 yards, the fifth-most in the NFC that season.

On March 15, 2005, McDougle signed with the Miami Dolphins. With the Dolphins, McDougle played nine games and started two.

One year to the day he signed with the Dolphins, McDougle signed with the Jacksonville Jaguars on March 15, 2006. McDougle played in 11 games in 2006 with no starts. The Jaguars placed McDougle on injured reserve on August 18, 2007 for a ruptured Achilles tendon. McDougle sat out the entire 2007 season.

Personal life
McDougle is the older brother of defensive end Jerome McDougle and has two cousins who played in the NFL: safety Tyrone Carter and defensive tackle Tommie Harris. McDougle is married and has five children.

McDougle was arrested for battery on December 28, 2007 after assaulting the owner of a landscaping company over a debt dispute.

References

1977 births
Living people
African-American players of American football
American football offensive tackles
Deerfield Beach High School alumni
Detroit Lions players
Jacksonville Jaguars players
Miami Dolphins players
Navarro Bulldogs football players
Oklahoma Sooners football players
People from Pompano Beach, Florida
Players of American football from Florida
21st-century African-American sportspeople
20th-century African-American sportspeople
Sportspeople from Broward County, Florida